"Cheaper to Keep Her" is a song by Canadian country music artist Aaron Lines. It is the first single released from his 2007 album Moments That Matter. It reached number one on the Billboard Canada Country chart.

Music video
The music video for "Cheaper to Keep Her" features cameos from Rhett Warrener, Darren McCarty, Jamie McLennan, Richie Regehr and Paul Brandt.

Chart performance

References

2007 singles
Aaron Lines songs
Songs written by Chris Lindsey
2007 songs